Hambleden Pairs Challenge Cup is a rowing event for women's coxless pairs at the annual Henley Royal Regatta on the River Thames at Henley-on-Thames in England. 

The event is open to members of any club but the crew must have British Rowing Senior status in rowing. It was inaugurated in 2017.

Winners

References
 

Events at Henley Royal Regatta
Rowing trophies and awards